Col. Maharaj Prem Singh (1915–2000) was an Indian polo player born in a polo-playing family on 15 November 1915. His grandfather, Maharaj Bhopal Singh was an excellent horseman while his grand uncle Sir Pratap Singh of Idar was a renowned polo player. Maharaj Prem received most of his training from his father, Maharaj Kishen Singh, who himself was an excellent player and had received training from the famous Major-General Delisle.

Early life
He received early encouragement to play polo from his Principal, A. P. Cox, at Chopasani School and eventually joined his father’s regiment, the Jodhpur Lancers in 1937. The following year, his team won the prestigious Rajpipla Cup in Mumbai defeating all the cavalry teams including the Poona Horse. This was his first major victory. Thereafter, during the Second World War (1939–45), he further enhanced his play skills and played tournaments in Peshawar and Risalpur. His handicap during this period was increased to +7 (the highest for any Indian at that time).

He reached the apex of his career in 1952-53 in England when he was invited by L. Arthur Lucas to play for his team, the Woolmers Park. The team composed of Arthur Lucas (England), Maharaj Prem, Carlos de la Serna (Argentina) and Francisco Astaburuaga (Chile) won every tournament they played that season (1953) in England, which included the Cowdray Cup, the Senior Cup, the Subsidiary Cup and the Midhurst Cup. Subsequently in France, they won the Silver Cup, the Gold Cup and the Deauville World Cup the same season. Maharaj Prem became the first Indian to be a part of a team to win the World Cup in Polo.

His team, the ‘Golden Falcons’ won all major tournaments in Egypt in 1951-52 when he was invited to play there by Vahid Yusri Pasha. In 1955, General Rafael Trujillo invited him to play in Dominican Republic where he spent a year and visited the United States of America for the first time. Thereafter, in 1959-60, he played the North American Championship for ‘Oak brook’ on invitation by Paul Butler. In 1962, he was awarded the Arjuna Award (first for polo) by the Government of India in recognition of his achievements.

By the 1970s, Maharaj Prem had started spending considerable amount of time popularising and revitalizing polo in Calcutta, Madras and Mumbai. Several industrial families supported him through his endeavours which included industrialists like Shyam Sunder Jalan in Calcutta, Hansraj Mariwala in Mumbai and A. C. Muthiah in Madras. In the 1980s, he was actively coaching teams which included the Cambridge and Woolmers Park Polo Club teams, the Indian Army team, members of Delhi Polo Club and others.

Maharaj Prem apart from being a renowned polo player also won several golf tournaments (Asian Championship in Calcutta in 1960 amongst the many others), shooting championships, tennis championships and cycle-polo tournaments during his lifetime. He also tried breeding and training horses for polo at his farm, after which he often named his polo team ‘Karnisar’. He wrote poetry in Urdu and Marwari (some of which can be found displayed at the Mehrangarh Fort, Jodhpur) and spent considerable amount of time developing schemes to bring water to his erstwhile jagir Rajlani to improve living conditions of people in the area.

He died after a long spell of illness in January 2000 in Jodhpur.  The same year, the Maharana Mewar Foundation released a book published by Roli Books, Polo in India: A tribute to Maharaj Prem Singh, to commemorate his achievements.

Children and Grandchildren 
Maharaj Prem Singh married  Rani Gulab Kanwar, daughter of Thakur Devi Singh of Doongri, and had 3 children. 

The eldest is Rani Aruna Singh, who married Apji Vijai Singh of Koela, also a distinguished polo player. They had 2 children.

 Kanwar Mahiraj Singh, who is now based in Australia.
 Baiji lal Sulina Kumari, who is survived by her daughters, Baisa Raveena Kumari and Baisa Shivina Kumari.

Rani Sheela Kumari Singh married Rajkumar Rameshwar Singh of Suket. They had 2 children.

 Yuvrani Kalpana Devi, married Yuvaraj Ijyaraj Singh of Kota, Rajasthan. They have one son, Kanwar Jaidev Singh.
 Kunwar Jai Singh, married Rajkumari Mriganka Kumari, daughter of Maharaj Shri Dalip Singhji Sahib of Jodhpur.

Maharaj Karan Singh married Rani Jayanti Kumari, and had 2 children.

 Rajkumar Prithi Singh
 Baiji lal Priya Kumari

Books
 Polo in India: a tribute to Maharaj Prem Singh by Sarina Singh

Awards

 Arjuna Award 1961

Indian polo players
Rajasthani people
People from Jodhpur
Polo players from Rajasthan
Recipients of the Arjuna Award
Military personnel from Rajasthan
1915 births
2000 deaths